Berlin Frankfurter Allee is a railway station situated on Frankfurter Allee in the Friedrichshain district of Berlin, close to the district's border with Lichtenberg. It is served by the S-Bahn lines ,  (the ringbahn),  and the U-Bahn line .

History
The station was first opened on 1 May 1872 as Friedrichsberg. In 1890-91 the current station Frankfurter Allee was erected, in addition to the platform between the tracks, the station had a brick entrance building. 
When the U5 was built at the end of the 1920s, the old Ringbahn bridge was torn down and replaced with a wider bridge. There was intended to be a direct connection between the underground U5 station and the above ground S-bahn station;- however, this was never developed. It is not practical to build such a connection now as the S-bahn platform would need to be on the bridge over the road. As the rails are not wide apart enough to fit a platform between them, the bridge would need to be entirely rebuilt. The station was named Stalinallee between 1949 and 1961.

References

Berlin S-Bahn stations
Buildings and structures in Friedrichshain-Kreuzberg
Railway stations in Germany opened in 1872